Nonius Philippus was a governor of Britannia Inferior, a province of Roman Britain by AD 242. Little else is known of him as he is mentioned only on a dedication at Old Carlisle.

Roman governors of Britain
Ancient Romans in Britain
Philippus, Nonius
3rd-century Romans